Mîrzești is a commune in Orhei District, Moldova. It is composed of two villages, Mîrzaci and Mîrzești.

References

Communes of Orhei District